Statistics of Ekstraklasa for the 1931 season.

Overview
It was contested by 12 teams, and Garbarnia Kraków won the championship.

League table

Results

References
Poland - List of final tables (RSSSF)

Ekstraklasa seasons
1
Pol
Pol